Northern China and Southern China are two approximate regions within China. The exact boundary between these two regions is not precisely defined and only serve to depict where there appears to be regional differences between the climates and localities of northern regions of China vs southern regions of China. Nevertheless, regional differences in culture and language have historically fostered a number of local identities.

Extent 
Often used as the geographical dividing line between northern and southern China is the Qinling–Huaihe Line (lit. Qin Mountains–Huai River Line). This line approximates the 0 °C January isotherm and the  isohyet in China.

Culturally, however, the division is more ambiguous. In the eastern provinces like Jiangsu and Anhui, the Yangtze River may instead be perceived as the north–south boundary instead of the Huai River, but this is a recent development.

There is an ambiguous area, the Nanyang Basin region in Henan, that lies in the gap where the Qin has ended and the Huai River has not yet begun; also, central Anhui and Jiangsu lie south of the Huai River but north of the Yangtze, making their classification somewhat ambiguous as well. As such, the boundary between northern and southern China does not follow provincial boundaries; it cuts through Shaanxi, Henan, Anhui, and Jiangsu, and creates areas such as Hanzhong (Shaanxi), Xinyang (Henan), Huaibei (Anhui) and Xuzhou (Jiangsu) that lie on the opposite half of China from the rest of their respective provinces. This may have been deliberate; the Yuan dynasty and Ming dynasty established many of these boundaries intentionally to discourage anti-dynastic regionalism.

The Northeast and Inner Mongolia are conceived to belong to northern China according to the framework above. At some times in history, Xinjiang, Tibet and Qinghai were not conceived of as being part of either the north or south. However, internal migration, such as between the Shandong and Liaodong peninsulas during the Chuang Guandong period, have increased the purview of "north" China to include previously marginalized areas.

History 

The concepts of northern and southern China originate from differences in climate, geography, culture, and physical traits; as well as several periods of actual political division in history. Northern and northeastern China is considered too cold and dry for rice cultivation (though rice is grown there today with the aid of modern technology) and consists largely of flat plains, grasslands, and desert; while Southern China is warm and rainy enough for rice and consists of lush mountains cut by river valleys. Historically, these differences have led to differences in warfare during the pre-modern era, as cavalry could easily dominate the northern plains but encountered difficulties against river navies fielded in the south. There are also major differences in cuisine, culture, and popular entertainment forms such as opera.

Episodes of division into North and South include:
 Three Kingdoms (220–280)
 Sixteen Kingdoms (317–420) and Southern and Northern Dynasties (420–589)
 Five Dynasties and Ten Kingdoms period (907–960)
 Southern Song dynasty (1127–1279) and Jin dynasty (1115–1234)
 Warlord era (1916–1928) of the Republic of China

The Northern and Southern Dynasties showed such a high level of polarization between North and South that sometimes northerners and southerners referred to each other as barbarians; subjects of the Yuan dynasty were divided into four political status classes. Northerners included the Khitans and other ethnic groups occupy the third-caste and southern natives occupying the lowest one.

For a large part of Chinese history, northern China was economically more advanced than southern China. The Jin and Yuan invasions caused a massive migration to southern China, and the Emperor shifted the Song dynasty capital city from Kaifeng in northern China to Hangzhou, located south of the Yangtze River. The population of Shanghai increased from 12,000 households to over 250,000 inhabitants after Kaifeng was sacked by invading armies. This began a shift of political, economic, and cultural power from northern China to southern China.  The east coast of southern China remained a leading economic and cultural center of China until the Republic of China. Today, southern China remains economically more prosperous than northern China.

During the Qing dynasty, regional differences and identification in China fostered the growth of regional stereotypes. Such stereotypes often appeared in historic chronicles and gazetteers and were based on geographic circumstances, historical and literary associations (e.g. people from Shandong, were considered upright and honest) and Chinese cosmology (as the south was associated with the fire element, Southerners were considered hot-tempered). These differences were reflected in Qing dynasty policies, such as the prohibition on local officials to serve their home areas, as well as conduct of personal and commercial relations. In 1730, the Kangxi Emperor made the observation in the Tingxun Geyan (《庭訓格言》):

During the Republican period, Lu Xun, a major Chinese writer, wrote:

Today 

In modern times, North and South are merely one of the ways that Chinese people identify themselves, and the divide between northern and southern China has been complicated both by a unified Chinese nationalism as well as by local loyalties to linguistically and culturally distinct regions within the province, prefecture, county, town and village isolates which prevent a coherent Northern or Southern identity from forming.

During the Deng Xiaoping reforms of the 1980s, South China developed much more quickly than North China, leading some scholars to wonder whether the economic fault line would create political tension between north and south.  Some of this was based on the idea that there would be a conflict between the bureaucratic north and the commercial south.  This has not occurred to the degree feared, in part because the economic fault lines eventually created divisions between coastal China and the interior, as well as between urban and rural China, which run in different directions from the north–south division, and in part because neither north nor south has any type of obvious advantage within the Chinese central government. Besides, there are other cultural divisions that exist within and across the north–south dichotomy.

Differences 
Nevertheless, the concepts of North and South continue to play an important role in regional stereotypes.

"Northerners" are seen as:
 Speaking Mandarin Chinese with a northern (rhotic) accent.
 More likely to eat noodles, dumplings and wheat-based foods (rather than rice-based foods).

While "Southerners" are seen as:
 Speaking Mandarin Chinese with a southern (non-rhotic) accent or speaking any southern Chinese language, such as Yue (e.g. Cantonese), Min (e.g. Hokkien), Wu (e.g. Shanghainese), Hakka, Xiang or Gan.
 More likely to eat rice-based foods (rather than wheat-based foods) and seafood.

These are seen as stereotypes among a large and greatly varied population.

Climate 

The main influences for the dichotomy between northern regions of China and southern regions of China is indisputably the climate each region experiences, which shape the local landscape. Southern regions of China are closer to the tropics, where it would experience severe monsoons such as the East Asian monsoon as well as some parts lying in temperate to some regions lying in subtropical regions. Some examples include regions in southeast China with such environments such as the South China–Vietnam subtropical evergreen forests.

On the other hand, northern regions of China experience different conditions and climates, where winters are cold and dry versus in southern regions of China where summers can be very hot and humid.

See also 
 Cultural regions in China 
 List of regions of China
 North China (Eastern Inner Mongolia is also part of Northeast Asia)
 Northeast China (also part of Northeast Asia)
 Southeast China
 East China (some geographers include the Taiwan Island, Penghu, Kinmen, Matsu Islands, and Senkaku Islands in this subregion)
 South Central China
 Central China
 South China (including the Hainan Island, Paracel Islands, and Zhongsha Islands)
 Western China
 Northwest China 
 Southwest China 
 Nanquan (Southern Fist)
 North China (disambiguation)
 North–South divide in Taiwan
 Northern, Central and Southern Vietnam
 South China (disambiguation)
 Wushu (Kung Fu)
 Zhonghua minzu
Great Qing Famine

Notes

References

Citations

Sources 

 
 
 
 Muensterberger, Warner (1951). "Orality and Dependence: Characteristics of Southern Chinese." In Psychoanalysis and the Social Sciences, (3), ed. Geza Roheim (New York: International Universities Press).

Further reading 

 Ebrey, Patricia Buckley; Liu, Kwang-chang. (1999). The Cambridge Illustrated History of China. Cambridge University Press.  (ch. 4, 5)
 Lewis, Mark Edwards. (2009). China Between Empires: The Northern and Southern Dynasties. Harvard University Press. 
 Tu, Jo-fu. (1992). Chinese Surnames and the Genetic Differences Between North and South China. Project on Linguistic Analysis, University of California, Berkeley.

Regions of China
Chinese culture